Andria Lloyd (born 10 August 1971 in Rastatt, West Germany) participated in the 1996 Summer Olympics.  She received a bronze medal, competing for Jamaica in the 4 × 100 m relay.

Lloyd attended high school in Camperdown. She attended college at the University of Alabama. Her personal best is 11.36 seconds in the 100 m, which came in 1996.

References

Living people
1971 births
People from Rastatt
Sportspeople from Karlsruhe (region)
Olympic bronze medalists in athletics (track and field)
Jamaican female sprinters
Olympic athletes of Jamaica
Athletes (track and field) at the 1996 Summer Olympics
Medalists at the 1996 Summer Olympics
Olympic bronze medalists for Jamaica
University of Alabama alumni
Olympic female sprinters
20th-century Jamaican women
21st-century Jamaican women